Vyvyan Enid Donner (December 26, 1895 – June 27, 1965) was an American fashion editor, film director, screenwriter, theatrical costume designer and caricaturist, perhaps best remembered for narrating numerous Movietone newsreels.

Early life and career
On December 26, 1895, Vyvyan Enid Donner was born in New York City, the only child of Herman Montague and Emma Adelaide Donner (née Wilkins). Raised in Brooklyn, Donner attended St. Catherine's Hall and later Adelphi Academy before studying briefly with Ethel Traphagen at Cooper Union and George Bridgman at the Art Students' League.

Partial filmography
 Silk for Summer Nights (1935)
 Fashion Forecast: For Play Hours (December 1939)
 Fashion Forecast: For Outdoors (April 1940) 
 Fashion Forecast: For Country Life (July 1940) 
 Behind the Footlights (April 1946)
 From Morn 'Til Dawn (April 1946)
 Talented Beauties (May 1949)

Death
On June 27, 1965, Donner died of natural causes in her home at 205 West 57th Street in Manhattan.

See also
 List of caricaturists

References

Further reading

Articles

 Franc, Alice (July 24, 1915). "'It Just Happened to Happen That Way'—One School Girl's Version of Business Success in Theatrical Designing". New York Tribune. p. 5
 Mishkin, Herman (July 1916). "Vyvyan Donner". The Green Book Magazine. p. 108
 McCabe, Linda Rose (November 1922). "The Vitalized Silhouette". Arts & Decoration. pp. 17, 66, 69
 Times staff (February 11, 1923). "Color, Movement, Life! They're my Art—Girl Poster Creator Says". The New Brunswick Times. p. 4
 Star staff (February 20, 1923). "Vitalized Silhouette". The Seattle Star. p. 10 
 Donner, Vyvyan (November 7, 1925). "Of Interest to Women: Today's Practical Bride May Wear Her Wedding Gown as Everyday Frock". The Riverine Herald. p. 4
 Donner, Vyvyan (December 5, 1925). "The Flare Dominates the Coat World, and the Fur Coat Becomes Elaborate". The Riverine Herald. p. 5
 Donner, Vyvyan (January 2, 1926). "Fashion Switches Bows From the Front to the Back". The Riverine Herald. p. 3
 Monitor staff (January 26, 1926). "Scissors, Silhouettes and Success". Christian Science Monitor. p. 8
 Donner, Vyvyan (March 15, 1926). "Barrel Silhouette the Novelty of This Season". The Albany Despatch. p. 4
 Donner, Vyvyan (April 10, 1926). "Women's Realm: Headdress Hunches for the Bob-Haired Beauty". The Riverine Herald. p. 6
 Donner, Vyvyan (April 29, 1926). "Women's Realm: The High Collar Makes a Bow in the Southland". The Riverine Herald. p. 4
 Donner, Vyvyan (May 10, 1926). "They're Not All Dressed Up, But They've Some Place to Go". The Albany Despatch. p. 4
 Donner, Vyvyan (May 13, 1926). "Furs Are Dyed All Colors Now; Idea Is to Match It". The Riverine Herald. p. 4
 Vincent, Florence Smith (July 29, 1926). "Living and Loving". The Allentown Morning Call. p. 15
 Times staff (December 4, 1927). "How Men Treat Women". The Los Angeles Times. p. 73
 Donner, Vyvyan (March 11, 1928). "Bringing the Tidings to Broadway: A Press Agent Discusses Certain Angles of the Try-Out, and Incidentally Presents a Few Brickbats". The New York Times. Sec. 8, p. 2
 Back, Elizabeth Edwards (May 25, 1939). "Women in the World: A Fashion Director". Western Mail. p. 25
 Herald staff (August `17, 1939). "Film Clips Cost £500 for 75 Seconds; Vyvyan Donner's Fashions". Sydney Morning Herald. p. 24
 "Vyvyan Donner, Whose Life Is a Glorious Cycle of Fashions and Camera Angles". Coronet.
 Turner, Grace (September 15, 1940). "Vyvyan Donner, movie fashion-news director, succeeds as hostess by serving this good food". Washington Evening Star. p. 17
 Carnegie, Dale (June 25, 1943). "Act On Your Ideas". The Coolidge Examiner. p. 4
 Inquirer staff (September 12, 1944). "Judges Select 87 War Bond Winners". The Philadelphia Inquirer. p. 15
 Meredith, Ann (1945). "Fashion Movie in the Making." The Akron Beacon-Journal. pp. 62, 63, 64, 65
 Lockerman, Doris (March 21, 1948). "Let's See Now: Roaring Twenties—And She Knows Why". The Atlanta Constitution. p. 14-C
 Lockerman, Doris (April 22, 1948). "Let's See Now: Call Gendarmes! Here Comes Ice". The Atlanta Constitution. p. 18  
 Cabot, Cynthia (March 21, 1952). "18 Nations Join in Shore Fashion Revue". The Philadelphia Inquirer. p. 37
 McCleod, Edyth Thornton (April 4, 1956). Beauty After 40". Tyler Morning Telegraph. p. 32

Books
 Chase, Ilka (1945). Past Imperfect. Garden City, NY: Blue Ribbon Books. pp. 243–244. 
 "Vivian Donner—for Plaintiff—Direct". Case on Appeal, Volume Two—Pages 753-1561. Supreme Court of the State of New York, Appellate Division—First Department. July 21, 1937. pp. 774-783. 
 Callahan, Michael (2018). The Night She Won Miss America. New York: Houghton Mifflin Harcourt. pp. 57–61. .
 Thompson, Neal (2013) A Curious Man: The Strange and Brilliant Life of Robert "Believe It or Not" Ripley. New York: Crown Pubnlishing. pp. 58, 286, 310, 343, 368 
 Webb, Graham (2020). Encyclopedia of American Short Films, 1926-1959. Jefferson, North Carolina : McFarland & Company, Inc., Publishers. .

External links
 
 
 
 

1895 births
1965 deaths
20th-century American artists
20th-century American journalists
American caricaturists
American costume designers
American poster artists
Cooper Union alumni
Art Students League of New York alumni
Artists from New York City
Fashion editors
Film directors from New York City
American people of Finnish descent